Our Lady of Prompt Succor, also known as Nuestra Señora de Biglang Awa, Nuestra Señora del Pronto Socorro, Nuestra Señora del Pronto Socorro de Binondo or Virgen del Pronto Socorro de Binondo is a framed beautifully colored oil painting placed over a sheet of metal. It shows the Virgin Mary with the infant Jesus seated on her right arm. She is dressed in a red tunic with a blue mantle. The face of our lady is very most pious and that of the holy infant so winning and expressive as He looks towards His Mother.

Description
The frame measures approximately 20 Centimeters in height and 15 and one half in with. Adorning the mantle and tunic of celestial virgin are small pearls and tiny gold stars. At her feet is a half-moon made of the same sheet of silver metal. Around the image is an oval arch of 12 golden stars. Two large ones at the lower part and four smaller pairs towards the top. The Holy Infant holds a golden globe crowned with a cross of the same precious metal. Both Mother and Child wear crowns of gold which are superimposed on the painting: for the half-moon at her feet, a chain of gold and pearls goes all around the border of the image described.

History
The image of Our Lady of Pronto Socorro was venerated during the year 1588 in the church of the Holy Kings of Parian in Manila, which was under the Dominican Fathers, making it one of the oldest venerated Marian image in the Philippines. The church was situated on the site that used to between the hanging bridge (Fuente Colgante) and the military hospital, later in 1598, the image was transferred to the church of St. Gabriel in Binondo, in the locality occupied by the business establishment. Finally after an earthquake of June 1863, the image was brought to the parish of Binondo where she is presently venerated and honored every second Saturday of the month.

Devotion
In olden times when the image was in her own church, the church of St. Gabriel, the faithful come to invoke her help and protection frequently, to obtain from her "Pronto Socorro", from the ills and necessities, Our Lady graciously answered their prayers promptly thereby earning the name of title which she came to be known.

Gallery

See also
 Miraculous Bigláng Awà
 Our Lady of Prompt Succor

References
 Barcelona, Mary Anne. Ynang Maria: A Celebration of the Blessed Virgin Mary in the Philippines. Edited by Consuelo B. Estepa, Ph.D. Pasig: Anvil Publishing, Inc, 2004.

Our Lady of Prompt Succor of Binondo
Roman Catholic Church in Metro Manila
Paintings in the Philippines
Shrines to the Virgin Mary
Catholic devotions
Catholic Mariology